Thakurgaon Sadar is an upazila of Thakurgaon District in the Division of Rangpur, Bangladesh.

Geography
It has 79823 households and total area 683.46 km2. It is bounded by Atwari and Boda upazilas on the north, Pirganj (Thakurgaon) and Birganj upazilas on the south, Boda, Debiganj and Birganj upazilas on the east, Baliadangi and Ranisankail upazilas on the west.

Demographics
According to the 2001 Bangladesh census, Thakurgaon sadar upazila has a population of 504428; males 260515, females 243913; Muslim 369486, Hindu 129794, Buddhist 3614, Christian 38 and others 1496. Indigenous communities such as santal, oraon, munda, Mushar and rajbanshi belong to this upazila.

As of the 1991 Bangladesh census, the upazila has a population of 422728. Males constitute 51.7% of the population, and females 48.3%. This Upazila's eighteen up population is 214112. Thakurgaon Sadar has an average literacy rate of 30.1% (7+ years), and the national average of 32.4% literate.

Administration
Thakurgaon Sadar Thana formed in 1800 and it was turned into an upazila in 1984.

Thakurgaon Upazila is divided into Thakurgaon Municipality and 19 union parishads: Akhanagar, Akcha, Auliapur, Balia, Baragaon, Begunbari, Chilarang, Debipur, Gareya, Jagannathpur, Jamalpur, Mohammadpur, Nargun, Rahimanpur, Rajagaon, Ruhea, Roypur, Salandar, and Sukhanpukhari. The union parishads are subdivided into 194 mauzas and 198 villages.

Gallery

See also
Upazilas of Bangladesh
Districts of Bangladesh
Divisions of Bangladesh

References

Upazilas of Thakurgaon District